Gatesville is the name of some places in the United States:

Gatesville, Indiana
Gatesville, North Carolina
Gatesville, Texas
Gatesville, Athlone, a commercial zone in Athlone, Cape Town, South Africa